Disney Girlz Rock 2 is a follow-up to the 2005 compilation of the same name. It includes some of the most popular female Disney artists like Miley Cyrus, Demi Lovato, Vanessa Hudgens, Ashley Tisdale, and Selena Gomez, as well as former Disney-turned-mainstream teen-pop acts and girl groups such as Hilary Duff and Aly & AJ. This album also contains a song by KSM. The CD was released on September 9, 2008. The album contains mostly songs that have been used on Disney Channel films and television series, as well as songs from artists that have received airplay on Radio Disney.

Track listing
"Start All Over" - Miley Cyrus
"Fuego" - The Cheetah Girls
"Let's Dance" - Vanessa Hudgens
"Hero In You" - KSM
"I Don't Think About It" - Emily Osment
"Rock Star" - Hannah Montana
"This Is Me" (Extended acoustic version) - Demi Lovato
"Cruella de Vil" - Selena Gomez
"Try" - Hayden Panettiere
"Too Cool" - Meaghan Jette Martin
"Like Whoa" - Aly & AJ
"I Wanna Go Back" - Jordan Pruitt
"Double Dutch Bus" - Raven-Symoné
"Fabulous" - Ashley Tisdale
"With Love" - Hilary Duff
"Lo Que Soy" (This Is Me) - Demi Lovato (Bonus track)

References

2008 compilation albums
Pop compilation albums
Walt Disney Records compilation albums
Disney Channel albums